Kim Clijsters defeated Li Na in the final, 3–6, 6–3, 6–3 to win the women's singles tennis title at the 2011 Australian Open. It was her first Australian Open title and her fourth major overall. Li became the first Asian player to reach a singles major final, and would go on to win the French Open a few months later.

Serena Williams was the two-time reigning champion, but did not participate due to a long-term foot injury.

The fourth-round match between Svetlana Kuznetsova and Francesca Schiavone, which lasted 4 hours and 44 minutes, was the longest women's singles major match, with Schiavone winning in the third set, 16–14.

This marked the last major for two former world No. 1's: Justine Henin and Dinara Safina, who both retired due to injury (Henin's elbow and Safina's back).

This was the first major where Caroline Wozniacki competed as the world No. 1; she lost to Li in the semifinals.

Seeds

Qualifying

Draw

Finals

Top half

Section 1

Section 2

Section 3

Section 4

Bottom half

Section 5

Section 6

Section 7

Section 8

Championship match statistics

References

External links
 2011 Australian Open – Women's draws and results at the International Tennis Federation

Women's Singles
Australian Open (tennis) by year – Women's singles
2011 in Australian women's sport
2011 WTA Tour